Lysvaella is a fossil taxon that has been interpreted both as a stem-group corallinaceaen and a vascular plant.

References

Enigmatic Archaeplastida taxa
Prehistoric eukaryote genera